Karl Morten Eek (born 25 June 1988) is a Norwegian footballer who plays as a defender for Steinkjer in 3. divisjon.

He was born in Sparbu and started his career in Sparbu IL. He made his senior debut in May 2005, for Steinkjer FK. He attracted the interest of both Molde FK and Rosenborg BK, but joined FK Bodø/Glimt ahead of the 2009 season. In the latter half of 2009 he was loaned out to Nybergsund IL-Trysil. Ahead of the 2012-season, Eek signed with the Superettan-club Umeå, before he returned to Norway and Ranheim in 2013. Ahead of the 2019 season he was released from Ranheim and went back to Steinkjer in 3. divisjon.

Career statistics

Club

References

1988 births
Living people
People from Steinkjer
Norwegian footballers
FK Bodø/Glimt players
Løv-Ham Fotball players
Nybergsund IL players
Umeå FC players
Ranheim Fotball players
Eliteserien players
Norwegian First Division players
Superettan players
Norwegian expatriate footballers
Expatriate footballers in Sweden
Norwegian expatriate sportspeople in Sweden
Steinkjer FK players
Association football defenders
Sportspeople from Trøndelag